Johann Albrecht Adelgrief (died 11 October 1636) was an alleged German prophet, born in the environs of Elbląg (Elbing), Royal Prussia (a fief of the Crown of Poland). He was the son of a Protestant minister, and well skilled in the ancient languages.

He asserted that seven angels had come down from heaven and given him the commission to banish evil from the world, and to scourge the monarchs with rods of iron. He was arrested at Königsberg (Królewiec), accused of witchcraft, and condemned to death with all his writings suppressed.

Notes

References

Year of birth missing
1636 deaths
People from Elbląg
People from Royal Prussia
German people in the Polish–Lithuanian Commonwealth
People executed for witchcraft
17th-century German people
Witch trials in Germany